List of speakers of the House of Assembly of Saint Lucia.

Speakers of the Legislative Council

Speakers of the House of Assembly

See also
House of Assembly of Saint Lucia

References

Politics of Saint Lucia
Saint Lucia
Speakers of the House of Assembly of Saint Lucia